Rimma Petlevannaya (born September 30, 1970) is a Russian and Scottish rugby union player. She plays at the position of half (n ° 10). She played for the Russian women's rugby union team, and the Scotland women's rugby union team.

Career 
She competed at the 1991 Women's Rugby World Cup, for the Soviet Union.

She moved to Scotland, she became a Scottish international. She made her international debut for Scotland against the Netherlands in November 1996.

She competed at the 2001 FIRA Women's European Championship, with the champion side.

She competed at the 2002 Women's Rugby World Cup, for Scotland. She was part of the team that traveled to Edmonton in Canada to achieve the best possible result at the 2006 Women's Rugby World Cup.

She has 78 caps as of 15 August 2006. 

She plays club for Murrayfield Wanderers. She also had the honor of wearing the colors of the British and Irish Rugby Union Lionesses.

References

External links 

 Rimma Petlevannaya Getty
1970 births
Scottish rugby union players
Living people
Soviet rugby union players